Parasosibia is a genus of phasmids belonging to the family Lonchodidae.

Species:

Parasosibia ceylonica 
Parasosibia descendens 
Parasosibia incerta 
Parasosibia inferior 
Parasosibia maculata 
Parasosibia parva 
Parasosibia villosa

References

Lonchodidae
Phasmatodea genera